James Brett Wilks (born 5 April 1978) is an English film producer, vegan activist, a combatives expert and instructor, and former professional mixed martial artist. A professional from 2003 until 2012, he competed for the UFC, King of the Cage, and was the winner of Spike TV's The Ultimate Fighter: United States vs. United Kingdom

Biography
Wilks was born and raised in Leicestershire, England. He attended Uppingham School. After leaving Uppingham in 1996, Wilks went to Bournemouth University, obtaining a Bachelor of Science degree in Business and Land Management. He moved to Winchester.

Mixed martial arts career
Wilks began training Karate and Bruce Lee's martial art style, Jeet Kune Do while living in the United Kingdom. Wilks holds black belts in Karate and Brazilian Jiu-Jitsu.

He had his first professional fight against The Ultimate Fighter 5 competitor, Roman Mitichyan. Wilks won the fight via armbar submission in the second round. After the fight he took around a year break from fighting so he could focus on training his students. He came back to have his second fight and lost to Jimmy Smith. Before going to tape The Ultimate Fighter 9, Wilks won the Gladiator Challenge welterweight title.

The Ultimate Fighter
He defeated the highly regarded Che Mills by submission in an elimination match earning him a trip to Las Vegas, Nevada to compete on the show. Wilks had his second fight against Team United States fighter Frank Lester; Wilks won by submission in the second round. In the semi-finals, Wilks faced Lester for a second straight time, after Lester returned to the tournament to defeat David Faulkner while substituting for Jason Pierce, who was removed from the competition by Dana White. In the rematch, Wilks defeated Lester by TKO via knees in the third round, earning a spot in the live finale.

Ultimate Fighting Championship
Wilks made his debut for the UFC winning against DaMarques Johnson at The Ultimate Fighter: United States vs. United Kingdom Finale on 20 June 2009. The fight crowned Wilks as the TUF 9 welterweight champion. Wilks dominated the fight against Johnson showing off strong striking and good submission attempts. Wilks finished the fight with Johnson via a rear naked choke submission in the closing seconds of the first round.

Wilks lost to Matt Brown via 3rd-round TKO, on 14 November 2009 at UFC 105. After being knocked down in the second and being saved by the bell from a submission attempt, Wilks came back early in the third round, attempting a kimura, before losing top position. Brown then, from top position, secured the TKO victory. Prior to UFC 115, Wilks revealed that Brown had broken his orbital bone with an elbow strike after just 30 seconds of the first round.

Wilks then faced Peter Sobotta at UFC 115. He won the fight via unanimous decision.

Wilks next fought Canadian prospect Claude Patrick at UFC 120 in London. He lost the fight via unanimous decision.

Wilks was expected to face Rory MacDonald on 30 April 2011 at UFC 129.  However, Wilks was replaced on the card by Nate Diaz.

Wilks was expected to replace Duane Ludwig, and face Amir Sadollah at UFC Fight Night 24.  However, Wilks was also injured and was replaced by DaMarques Johnson.

Retirement
After suffering extensive injuries which included a fractured vertebra and after doctors told him he faced "significantly high risk of paralysis" if he continued to fight, Wilks announced his retirement from active MMA competition on 14 May 2012.

Personal life
Wilks has a wife named Alicia. Wilks is also known for his dedication to veganism.
Wilks is also a combatives instructor.

The Game Changers 
Wilks had a leading role in the documentary film The Game Changers (2018), advocating a primarily plant-based diet in high-performance sport and produced by James Cameron.

Championships and accomplishments

Brazilian jiu-jitsu
Gracie US Nationals
Gracie US Nationals 2008 Gold Medalist (Advanced Division, 185lbs)

Mixed martial arts
Ultimate Fighting Championship
The Ultimate Fighter Season 9 Winner
Gladiator Challenge
GC Welterweight Championship (One time)

Mixed martial arts record 

|-
| Loss
| align=center| 7–4
| Claude Patrick
| Decision (unanimous)
| UFC 120
| 
| align=center| 3
| align=center| 5:00
| London, England
| 
|-
| Win
| align=center| 7–3
| Peter Sobotta
| Decision (unanimous)
| UFC 115
| 
| align=center| 3
| align=center| 5:00
| Vancouver, British Columbia, Canada
| 
|-
| Loss
| align=center| 6–3
| Matt Brown
| TKO (punches)
| UFC 105
| 
| align=center| 3
| align=center| 2:26
| Manchester, England
| 
|-
| Win
| align=center| 6–2
| DaMarques Johnson
| Submission (rear naked choke)
| The Ultimate Fighter: United States vs. United Kingdom Finale
| 
| align=center| 1
| align=center| 4:54
| Las Vegas, Nevada, United States
| 
|-
| Win
| align=center| 5–2
| Mike Robles
| Submission (armbar)
| GC 85: Cross Fire
| 
| align=center| 2
| align=center| 4:27
| San Diego, California, United States
| 
|-
| Win
| align=center| 4–2
| John Cole
| TKO (knees)
| Apocalypse Fights 1: The First Sign
| 
| align=center| 1
| align=center| 0:26
| Coachella, California, United States
| 
|-
| Win
| align=center| 3–2
| Shawn Nagano
| Submission (rear naked choke)
| UAGF 4: Kaos on the Kampus
| 
| align=center| 2
| align=center| 4:22
| Los Angeles, California, United States
| 
|-
| Loss
| align=center| 2–2
| Patrick Speight
| Decision (unanimous)
| Total Combat 13: Anarchy
| 
| align=center| 3
| align=center| 3:00
| Del Mar, California, United States
| 
|-
| Win
| align=center| 2–1
| Ray Lizama
| TKO (cut)
| KOTC 41: Relentless
| 
| align=center| 1
| align=center| 1:14
| San Jacinto, California, United States
| 
|-
| Loss
| align=center| 1–1
| Jimmy Smith
| Submission (kneebar)
| KOTC 39: Hitmaster
| 
| align=center| 1
| align=center| 1:40
| San Jacinto, California, United States
| 
|-
| Win
| align=center| 1–0
| Roman Mitichyan
| Submission (armbar)
| UAGF Ultimate Cage Fighting 4
| 
| align=center| 2
| 
| Upland, California, United States
|

Mixed martial arts exhibition record

|-
| Win
| align=center| 3–0
| Frank Lester
| TKO (knees)
| The Ultimate Fighter: United States vs. United Kingdom
| 
| align=center| 3
| align=center| 
| Las Vegas, Nevada, United States
| 
|-
| Win
| align=center| 2–0
| Frank Lester
| Submission (armbar)
| The Ultimate Fighter: United States vs. United Kingdom
| 
| align=center| 2
| align=center| 3:06
| Las Vegas, Nevada, United States
| 
|-
| Win
| align=center| 1–0
| Che Mills
| Submission (heel hook)
| The Ultimate Fighter: United States vs. United Kingdom
| 
| align=center| 1
| align=center| 0:30
| Cheshire, England, United Kingdom
|

See also
List of male mixed martial artists

References

External links

UFC Profile
 James Wilks from UFC Fans

The Ultimate Fighter winners
Living people
1978 births
British veganism activists
Sportspeople from Leicestershire
English male mixed martial artists
Welterweight mixed martial artists
Mixed martial artists utilizing Jeet Kune Do
Mixed martial artists utilizing taekwondo
Mixed martial artists utilizing Brazilian jiu-jitsu
People educated at Uppingham School
English emigrants to the United States
English practitioners of Brazilian jiu-jitsu
People awarded a black belt in Brazilian jiu-jitsu
English male taekwondo practitioners
English Jeet Kune Do practitioners
English activists
Ultimate Fighting Championship male fighters